Clavulina amethystina is a species of coral fungus in the family Clavulinaceae.

References

External links

Fungi described in 1791
Fungi of North America
amethystina